Bhatiya railway station is a railway station on the Western Railway network in the state of Gujarat, India. Bhatiya railway station is 42 km far away from Khambhalia railway station. Passenger, Express and Superfast trains halt at Bhatiya railway station.

Major trains 

Following Express/Superfast trains halt at Bhatiya railway station in both direction:

 19251/52 Okha - Somnath Express
 16733/34 Okha - Rameswaram Express
 22945/46 Okha - Mumbai Central Saurashtra Mail
 19565/66 Okha - Dehradun Uttaranchal Express

References

See also
 Devbhumi Dwarka district

Railway stations in Devbhoomi Dwarka district
Rajkot railway division